Lee Chang-Gang  (born 9 December 1984) is a Japanese-born South Korean football goalkeeper, who plays for Fagiano Okayama in J2 League.

Club statistics

External links
 

 Lee Chang-Gang at Yahoo! Japan 

1984 births
Living people
Hannan University alumni
Association football people from Aichi Prefecture
South Korean footballers
South Korean expatriate footballers
J2 League players
Japan Football League players
Fagiano Okayama players
Expatriate footballers in Japan
South Korean expatriate sportspeople in Japan
Association football goalkeepers
Zainichi Korean people